Keighran is a surname. Notable people with the surname include:

Adam Keighran (born 1997), Australian rugby league player
Ben Keighran (born 1982), Australian businessman
Daniel Keighran (born 1983), Australian Army soldier and Victoria Cross recipient
Darren Keighran (born 1969), Australian rules footballer
Wade Keighran (born 1984), Australian musician